Itel may refer to:
Hitachi Data Systems, founded as Itel
Itel Mobile, a brand of Transsion Holdings